William E. West Sr. (1922–2014) was an American painter. Born in Pittsburgh, Pennsylvania in 1922, West moved to Buffalo, New York in 1927. His art career spanned for about 70 years.

Life and Family

In his early life West was encouraged by his mother to pursue his artistic interests. He was the youngest of seven siblings, born in 1922. A year after his birth he was adopted by his Aunt and later they moved to Buffalo in 1926. He spent the majority of his life living in the East Side of Buffalo.

When he returned from World War II in 1946, he attended art school and worked under many well-known artists including Charles E. Burtchfield and Robert Blair. The schools he attended during his studies were the Albright Art School and after that the Art Institute of Buffalo. He had two other jobs as a community organizer and a postal worker as well as his budding art career. West also had four children and a wife named Geraldine Summers.

Artwork

The subject matter of his art ranged from many different things including buildings under construction and demolished buildings, to a series inspired by the women in his life who were dressmakers. The most notable of his art were his landscapes that serve as tributes to the architectural past of the city of Buffalo. West never considered himself to be a professional artist, he simply did it because he loved to paint. In an interview he said,"...art continued to be something I pursued without an ambition to be a commercial artist or wanting to make money off of it. I just wanted to paint."

Death

West died in 2014 of congestive heart failure. Many buildings and an art gallery have his work in their permanent collection, one of these places being the Burchfield Penney Art Center.

References

"William E. West Sr." William E. West Sr. Artists Burchfield Penney Art Center. N.p., n.d. Web. December 5, 2016. <https://www.burchfieldpenney.org/artists/artist:william-e-west-sr/>.*
"A Community Tribute: The Art of William E. West, Sr." El Museo – Buffalo, NY. N.p., August 7, 2016. Web. December 5, 2016. <http://www.elmuseobuffalo.org/exhibitions/a-community-tribute-the-art-of-william-e-west-sr/>.
 http://www.facebook.com/TheBuffaloNews. "William West, Painter, Postal Worker and Community Activist – The Buffalo News." The Buffalo News. N.p., April 15, 2014. Web. December 13, 2016. <http://buffalonews.com/2014/04/15/william-west-painter-postal-worker-and-community-activist/>.

2014 deaths
1922 births
20th-century American painters
Artists from Pittsburgh
Artists from Buffalo, New York
American military personnel of World War II